Henry Paget may refer to:

 Henry Paget, 2nd Baron Paget (c. 1539–1568)
 Henry Paget, 1st Earl of Uxbridge (first creation) (1663–1743)
 Henry Paget, 1st Earl of Uxbridge (second creation) (1744–1812)
 Henry Paget, 2nd Earl of Uxbridge (1719–1769)  
 Henry Paget, 1st Marquess of Anglesey (1768–1854)
 Henry Paget, 2nd Marquess of Anglesey (1797–1869)
 Henry Paget, 3rd Marquess of Anglesey (1821–1880), British peer and Liberal politician
 Henry Paget, 4th Marquess of Anglesey (1835–1898), British peer
 Henry Paget, 5th Marquess of Anglesey (1875–1905)
 Henry Paget, 7th Marquess of Anglesey (1922–2013)
 Henry M. Paget (1856–1936), British painter and illustrator
 Henry Luke Paget (1853–1937), Anglican bishop